The 1906–07 Football League season was Aston Villa's 19th season in the First Division, the top flight of English football at the time. The season fell in what was to be called Villa's golden era.

Villa  signed Bobby Evans  in the summer of 1906 for a fee of £30 from Wrexham-the Welsh club then playing in the Birmingham and District League. While at Villa Evans continued to add to his tally of Welsh caps.

Aston Villa started the new year with a 0–1 defeat to Manchester United. The following month they recorded their biggest victory of the season beating Sheffield Wednesday 8–1.

Football League

References

External links
Aston Villa official website
avfchistory.co.uk 1906–07 season

Aston Villa F.C. seasons
Aston Villa